Mohamed Bouslimani (born 25 November 1956) is the Algerian Minister of Communications. He was appointed as minister on 13 November 2021.

Education 
Bouslimani holds a Bachelor of Political and Information Sciences.

References

External links 

 Ministry of Communications

Living people
1956 births
21st-century Algerian politicians
Algerian politicians
Government ministers of Algeria
Communication ministers of Algeria